The Blackburn Perth was a British flying boat which was in service during the interwar period. It was essentially an upgraded Iris, and hence the largest flying-boat to serve with the Royal Air Force at the time (and the largest biplane flying boat ever to serve with the RAF).

Design and development
The Blackburn R.B.3A Perth was designed as a replacement for the earlier Iris to Air Ministry Specification 20/32. Developed from the Iris Mk. V, the Perth first flew in 1933. It differed from the Iris by replacing the Rolls-Royce Condor engines of the Iris by more powerful Rolls-Royce Buzzards and having an enclosed cockpit for the pilots. Unusually, in addition to its normal armament, the Perth was fitted with a Coventry Ordnance Works C.O.W 37 mm (1.46 in) autocannon in its bows.

Four Perths were ordered for service for the RAF.

Operational history
The Perth entered service with the RAF in January 1934, when the second aircraft was delivered to No. 209 Squadron RAF at RAF Mount Batten Plymouth. Perths remained in service until 1937, being replaced by the Short Singapore and the Saro London. One aircraft was retained by the Marine Aircraft Experimental Establishment until 1938.

Operators
 
 Royal Air Force
 No. 204 Squadron RAF 
 No. 209 Squadron RAF 
 Marine Aircraft Experimental Establishment

Specifications (Perth)

See also

References

External links

British Blackburn-General Flying Boats 
"New Plane Hunts Submarines" Popular Science, January 1934
"Huge All Metal Flying Boat Weighs Ten Tons" Popular Mechanics, March 1931

Perth
1930s British patrol aircraft
Flying boats
Trimotors
Biplanes
Aircraft first flown in 1933